Phyllocnistis micrographa is a moth of the family Gracillariidae, known from Karnataka, India. It was named by E. Meyrick in 1916.

References

Phyllocnistis
Endemic fauna of India
Moths of Asia